HMY Royal Escape was a royal yacht used by King Charles II. She was a former collier in coastal trade named Surprise. 

King Charles took passage on Surprise after the final defeat of the royalist cause in 1651, narrowly avoiding pursuing Parliamentarian forces. He arrived safely in France, where he lived in exile until the  Restoration in 1660. On his return Charles purchased the ship he had travelled on, naming her after his escape from England nearly a decade before. He kept her moored close to his palace, showing her to visitors. The ship remained on the Navy Lists for many years, being sold finally in 1750, although several other vessels continued the name until 1877.

King Charles's escape
After the royalist defeat at the Battle of Worcester on 3 September 1651 King Charles II escaped and fled from the Parliamentarian forces who had orders to arrest him. He travelled eventually to Brighton, where he met the captain of a collier, Nicholas Tettersell, and arranged passage to France. Tettersell was the only person who was to know Charles's identity; the crew were told that the passengers were merchants fleeing their creditors.  Tettersell agreed to make the passage, and safely landed the royal party at Fécamp on his ship, the Surprise

Return
Charles remained fond of the ship that had helped his escape, and on his return to England at the Restoration in 1660, purchased her, renaming her Royal Escape. Charles had her moored in the Thames off the Palace of Whitehall, where he would show her off to other royalty.

She was retained on the navy lists for a number of years, being rebuilt in 1714 and 1736 as a transport. She was sold in 1750, though the name was perpetuated when a previously unnamed mooring lighter was renamed Royal Escape in 1749. This later craft was broken up in 1791, and a new Royal Escape was launched in 1792. This vessel, a transport, was broken up in 1877.

Notes

References

External links
 

 

Royal Yachts of the Kingdom of England
Ships of England
Charles II of England